Acacia dallachiana, commonly known as catkin wattle is a tree belonging to the genus Acacia and the subgenus Juliflorae that is native to south eastern Australia.

Description
It has smooth, grey or grey-brown coloured bark that becomes deeply fissured. the glabrous branchlets are angled towards the apices. Like most species of Acacia it has phyllodes rather than true leaves. The evergreen, grey to blue-green phyllodes have a  linear to narrowly lanceolate or narrowly elliptic shape and are commonly curved. It blooms between October and January producing golden flowers.

Taxonomy
The specific epithet honours John Dallachy, who was once the curator of the Royal Botanic Gardens in Melbourne.

Distribution
It is endemic to the southern parts of New South Wales and northern Victoria. In Victoria the shrub is considered rare and is found in the Snowy Mountains, Victorian Alps and highlands with the bulk of the population  confined to the montane and subalpine forests on the Buffalo Range and at Sassafras Gap. It extends into the far south east of New South Wales in the snowy mountains at higher altitudes where it is found growing in granitic soils as a part of wet sclerophyll forest and woodlands.

See also
List of Acacia species

References

dallachiana
Flora of New South Wales
Flora of Victoria (Australia)
Taxa named by Ferdinand von Mueller
Plants described in 1858